Akobo was a state in South Sudan that existed between 14 January 2017 and 22 February 2020.

History 
Akobo County was separated from Bieh State and made a separate state with the increase in the number of states from 28 to 32 on January 14, 2017. Gabriel Gai Riam was appointed governor on January 16, 2017, after the creation of the state, but was removed and replaced by Johnson Gony Bilieu two days later. Timothy Taban Juch was appointed governor on August 19, 2019 after the death of Johnson Gony Bilieu on July 4, 2019.

Upon its creation, a large part of Akobo State was held by the SPLM-IO.

Akobo experienced heavy flooding in late 2019.

Demographics 
Akobo State is inhabited by the Anyuak and the Lou subgroup of the Nuer. Some Anyuak were unhappy with the creation of the state, feeling that it was created for the Lou Nuer, although the feeling was not unanimous among the Anyuak. Anyuak feel betrayed because Akobo is their historical land.

References

States of South Sudan